The Ben Laughlin Water Tank House-Garage, near Jerome, Idaho, was built in 1927.  It was listed on the National Register of Historic Places in 1983.

It is located seven miles east and one and one-half miles south of Jerome.

It is the only water tank positively known to have been built by stonemason Ed Bennett which survives and is included in the 1983 survey of lava rock structures in the county.

References

External links

Buildings and structures on the National Register of Historic Places in Idaho
Buildings and structures completed in 1927
Buildings and structures in Jerome County, Idaho
Lava rock buildings and structures
National Register of Historic Places in Jerome County, Idaho
Water tanks on the National Register of Historic Places